Nesterovsky (masculine), Nesterovskaya (feminine), or Nesterovskoye (neuter) may refer to:
Nesterovsky District, a district of Kaliningrad Oblast, Russia
Nesterovskoye Urban Settlement, a municipal formation which the town of district significance of Nesterov in Nesterovsky District of Kaliningrad Oblast, Russia is incorporated as
Nesterovsky (inhabited locality), several rural localities in Russia